Philygria nigrescens is a species of shore flies in the family Ephydridae.

References

Ephydridae
Articles created by Qbugbot
Insects described in 1930